USA-168, also known as GPS IIR-9 and GPS SVN-45, is an American navigation satellite which forms part of the Global Positioning System. It was the ninth Block IIR GPS satellite to be launched, out of thirteen in the original configuration, and twenty one overall. It was built by Lockheed Martin, using the AS-4000 satellite bus.

USA-168 was launched at 22:09:01 UTC on 31 March 2003, atop a Delta II carrier rocket, flight number D297, flying in the 7925-9.5 configuration. The launch took place from Space Launch Complex 17A at the Cape Canaveral Air Force Station, and placed USA-168 into a transfer orbit. The satellite raised itself into medium Earth orbit using a Star-37FM apogee motor.

It is used to broadcast the PRN 21 signal, and operates in slot 3 of plane D of the GPS constellation. As of 2012 it remains in service.

References

Spacecraft launched in 2003
GPS satellites
USA satellites